The 2017–18 Adelaide United FC season was the club's 14th season since its establishment in 2003. The club participated in the A-League for the 13th time and the FFA Cup for the 4th time.

Players

Squad information

Transfers

Transfers in

Transfers out

From youth squad

Contract extensions

Technical staff

Squad statistics

Appearances and goals

|-
|colspan="24"|Players no longer at the club:

Pre-season and friendlies

Competitions

Overall

A-League

League table

Results summary

Results by round

Matches

Finals series

FFA Cup

References

External links
 Official Website

Adelaide United
Adelaide United FC seasons